Jose Cabalfin Calugas (December 29, 1907 – January 18, 1998) was a member of the Philippine Scouts during World War II. He received the Medal of Honor for actions during the Battle of Bataan.

At the age of 23, Calugas joined the Philippine Scouts of the United States Army and completed training as an artilleryman and served with different artillery batteries of the Philippine Scouts until his unit was mobilized to fight in World War II. After noticing one of his unit's gun batteries had been put out of commission and its crew killed, he gathered several members of his unit together, dug in and attempted to defend the line. He was captured along with other members of his unit and forced to march to a distant enemy prison camp, where he was held as a prisoner of war. When he was released in 1943, he was secretly assigned to a guerrilla unit in the Philippines where he fought for the liberation of the Philippines from the Japanese.

After World War II Calugas received a direct commission and became a United States citizen. Retiring from the Army, he settled in Tacoma, Washington.

Early life and military training
Calugas was born in Barrio Tagsing, Leon, Iloilo, Philippines, December 29, 1907. His mother died when he was ten, and he later left high school in order to work and support his family. In 1930, he enlisted in the United States Army and received his basic training at Fort Sill, Oklahoma. Upon completion, he received additional training as an artilleryman, and was then assigned to the 24th Artillery Regiment of the Philippine Scouts at Fort Stotsenburg, Pampanga. While stationed at Fort Stotsenburg, he married and began to raise a family. His next unit was the 88th Field Artillery Regiment of the Philippine Scouts. He was a Sergeant with Battery B when the United States and the Philippine Commonwealth, declared war with Japan in 1941. His unit was mobilized for duty and sent to Bataan in December 1941.

Action in World War II

Medal of Honor action at Bataan

On January 16, 1942, his unit was covering the withdrawal of a portion of the U.S. Army Forces Far East (USAFFE), with the 26th Cavalry Regiment of the Philippine Scouts and the 31st Infantry Regiment. Calugas was working as a mess sergeant in charge of a group of soldiers who were preparing the day's meals, known as KP duty. He noticed that one of his unit's 75 mm M1917 field gun had been silenced, and its crew killed. Once there, he organized a squad of volunteers who returned Japanese artillery fire. The position remained under constant and heavy fire for the rest of the afternoon. While Calugas and his squad maintained a steady fire on the enemy positions, other soldiers had time to dig in and defend the line. As the day ended and combat subsided, he returned to KP. For his actions on that day, his superiors recommended Calugas for the United States military's highest decoration for valor, the Medal of Honor. Before he could receive it, however, all American forces on Bataan surrendered to Japanese forces.

Surrender of Bataan and the death march

Arguably, the Battle of Bataan represented the most intense phase of Imperial Japan's invasion of the Philippines during World War II. During the final stage of the Battle of Bataan and after repeated assaults and artillery fire by Japanese forces, the communications and defenses of the allies on Bataan peninsula had been almost completely destroyed. On the last two days, the entire Allied defense collapsed, clogging all roads with refugees and fleeing troops. By April 8, the senior U.S. commander on Bataan, Major General Edward "Ned" P. King, Jr., recognized the futility of further resistance, and explored proposals for capitulation. On April 9, 1942, approximately 76,000 Filipino and American troops surrendered to a Japanese army of 54,000 men under Lt. General Masaharu Homma. This was the single largest surrender of one of its military forces in American history.

After the surrender, Calugas and the other prisoners marched from Mariveles to Camp O'Donnell, a prison camp in the province of Tarlac. The Japanese, having expected the fighting to continue, anticipated about 25,000 prisoners of war and were inadequately prepared or unwilling to transport a group of prisoners three times the size. The majority of the prisoners of war were immediately relieved of their belongings and endured a 61-mile (98 km) march in deep dust, over vehicle-broken macadam roads, and crammed into rail cars for the portion of the journey from San Fernando to Capas. En route, over 21,000 men and women died from disease, starvation, dehydration, heat prostration, untreated wounds, and wanton execution. The deaths of Filipinos to Americans was disproportionately high: approximately 5,000–10,000 Filipino and 600–650 American prisoners of war died on the Bataan Death March. Calugas remained a prisoner at Camp O'Donnell until January 1943, when he was released to work for the Japanese.

Post POW release
His release placed him as a laborer in a Japanese rice mill, and while assigned there he secretly joined a guerrilla unit, #227 Old Bronco. As an officer of the guerrilla unit, he participated in the attack on the Japanese garrison at Karangalan. His unit fought in the continued campaign against the Japanese, which eventually led to the liberation of the Philippines.

After the liberation of the Philippines in 1945, he finally received the Medal of Honor for which he had been approved at the beginning of the war. The Medal was presented to him by General of the Army General George Marshall. Calugas subsequently accepted a direct commission in the United States Army, and was later assigned to the 44th Infantry Regiment, which was assigned with the occupation of Okinawa. After the unit was disbanded in 1947, he was assigned to the Ryuku Command, on the Ryukyu Islands in the South China Sea, where he remained until 1953. He was later assigned to Fort Lewis, Washington.

Citizenship
Although he had been born in a U.S. territory, and had fought in the United States' Army, Calugas technically was not a citizen. Following the Spanish–American War in 1898, Philippine residents were classified as U.S. nationals. The 1934 Tydings–McDuffie Act, or Philippine Independence Act, reclassified Filipinos as aliens, and set a quota of 50 immigrants per year to the United States, with the exception of those who joined the U.S. Navy, but not the U.S. Army. While serving in Okinawa, Calugas completed the process of becoming a naturalized United States citizen.

Retirement and post military life
Calugas eventually retired from the army with the rank of Captain and in 1957 he moved to Tacoma, Washington with his family. After retiring from the army he earned a degree in Business Administration from the University of Puget Sound in 1961 and worked for the Boeing Corporation. In addition to furthering his education and starting a new career, he was involved in several veterans groups within the Seattle and Tacoma area. He died in Tacoma on January 18, 1998, at age 90, and is buried at Mountain View Memorial Park in Tacoma, Washington. He was survived by his three children, including retired Sergeant First Class Jose Calugas Jr., eleven grandchildren, and six great-grandchildren. His wife of 52 years died in 1991.

Honors and awards
Calugas earned multiple military decorations before he died, including the Medal of Honor.

Medal of Honor citation
The action for which the award was made took place near Culis, Bataan Province, Philippine Islands, on 16 January 1942. A battery gun position was bombed and shelled by the enemy until 1 gun was put out of commission and all the cannoneers were killed or wounded. Sgt. Calugas, a mess sergeant of another battery, voluntarily and without orders ran 1,000 yards across the shell-swept area to the gun position. There he organized a volunteer squad which placed the gun back in commission and fired effectively against the enemy, although the position remained under constant and heavy Japanese artillery fire.

Legacy
On Mount Samat, there is a relief commemorating the event that lead to the awarding of the Medal of Honor.

Within the family housing area of Fort Sam Houston, Texas, a street known as Calugas Circle was dedicated in his honor, with his family present, in 1999.

His Medal of Honor was given to the Fort's museum for safekeeping and display by Calugas and his family before his death.

In 2006, a 36-unit apartment building, designed for low-income and disabled residents was dedicated as the "Sgt. Jose Calugas, Sr. Apartments" in High Point, Seattle.

On Memorial Day in 2009, his memory was honored at the Living War Memorial Park on a memorial that had previously been established there.

See also

 List of Medal of Honor recipients for World War II
List of Asian American Medal of Honor recipients
List of foreign-born Medal of Honor recipients
List of Filipino Americans
List of Asian Americans
List of people from Iloilo

References

Further reading

External links

 KCTS9 Jose Calugas
 Pierce County, Washington obituaries

1907 births
People from Iloilo
1998 deaths
United States Army Medal of Honor recipients
United States Army officers
United States Army personnel of World War II
Filipino emigrants to the United States
American prisoners of war in World War II
Bataan Death March prisoners
University of Puget Sound alumni
Foreign-born Medal of Honor recipients
American military personnel of Filipino descent
Boeing people
People from Lakewood, Washington
World War II recipients of the Medal of Honor
World War II prisoners of war held by Japan
Visayan people